The Mission Friends was an interdenominational Christian, mostly Pietist and Radical Pietist association in Sweden and among Swedish Americans (Swedish immigrants) in the United States, that eventually had an impact on several Protestant denominations and their missionary societies today, even outside of Lutheranism, the Swedish community, and the United States, eventually influencing other communities and forming new independent Radical Pietist, Baptist – especially Swedish Baptist – and later on Pentecostal and Charismatic free church denominations.

History

Background and Mission Friends in Sweden 
The Mission Friends had their origins in the spiritual reform movements founded by laymen within the Lutheran Church of Sweden from the mid-19th century onwards, particularly the teachings of Swedish Pietists Carl Olof Rosenius and Peter Fjellstedt. The Evangeliska fosterlands-stiftelsen (today the Swedish Evangelical Mission), founded in 1856 by Fjellstedt and others, was the main association for the group. They called themselves  ('mission friends') or simply friends because of their particular focus on home and foreign missions.

In the United States 
The Mission Friends first emigrated to the United States in the early 1860s. They considered themselves Lutherans "but [did] not consider it right to call themselves after anyone." Their first missionary society was formed in Swede Bend, Iowa, on July 4, 1868, by missionary preacher Carl August Björk as a revival movement in an attempt to reform the local Lutheran church. At almost the same time, revival movements were also being started elsewhere in the Midwest. At Swede Point, north of Des Moines, Hans Blom preached, and elsewhere in Iowa, A. W. Hedenschoug and John Peterson were active preachers. In Galesburg, Illinois, Nicolaus Bergensköld, disciple of the "Reader Count" Adolphe Stackelberg, preached.

In Chicago, too, a missionary society was formed, which in 1869 became a congregation and was incorporated with the same rights as a church society. The Swedish Evangelical Lutheran Mission Synod was formed in 1873 and included most of the then-existing Swedish mission congregations in America, with the Swedish Evangelical Lutheran Ansgar Synod founded soon after.

American evangelist Dwight L. Moody was highly appreciated and influential among the Mission Friends, despite his lack of personal connection to Sweden or the Swedish language.

Converge Worldwide (Baptist General Conference) and the Baptist General Conference of Canada, are evangelical Baptist denominations of the Swedish Baptist variety, who gained influence from and a connection with fellow Pietists and Radical Pietists within the Mission Friends movement.

Free Mission Friends and Free Free 
In the 1880s, talks were held to determine whether or not to form a union of mission churches. Due to their desire to remain separate from other congregations,  ('the Free Friends') split from the majority in 1884, first known as the Swedish Evangelical Free Mission and later becoming the Evangelical Free Church of America. They did not believe in labels, rather focusing on interdenominational mission work. To this group belonged preachers such as Fredrik Franson, strongly influenced by Moody and his ecumenical revival preaching. Some of the radical Free Mission Friends, led by August Davis, formed a separate group known as the Free Free. They participated in speaking in tongues and healing, practices common in Pentecostalism. The Swedish Evangelical Lutheran Mission Synod merged in 1885 with another association, the Swedish Evangelical Lutheran Ansgar Synod, as well as some independent Mission Friends to form the Swedish Evangelical Mission Covenant in America. It eventually became the Evangelical Covenant Church, considered a sister church to the Mission Covenant Church of Sweden.

In the early 1910s, the Mission Friends ran "an immigrant mission, Alaskan and Chinese missions, and a retirement home and hospital" as well as founding what is today North Park University in 1895. Their publication  was published from 1874 to 1960.

Beliefs 
While initially associated with the Augustana Lutheran Church, the Mission Friends disapproved of their lack of zeal for missions and what they saw as a blend of "'spiritual' and 'worldly' elements", seeing it as "no great improvement on the state church of the old country". The Mission Friends' beliefs were described by Professor Axel Mellander, who stated, "they generally stand on Lutheran ground in their attitude to the means of grace." Despite believing it wrong to name themselves after anyone, they had a high view of Luther and often studied his writings. "They will not be bound by the Augsburg Confession, although sanctioning its contents in the main... As to the Doctrine of Atonement they have pretty generally accepted the view propounded by Waldenström... It may be said with relative accuracy that the Mission Covenant sustains the same relation to the Lutheran Church in this country as the Brethren (Moravians) do to that of Germany." He also compared their ecclesiology to "a middle road between the Congregational and the Presbyterian form."

See also 

 George Scott, associated Methodist preacher
 Pietisten, Rosenius' and Scott's journal for Mission Friends

References

Notes

Sources 
 
 

Christian organizations based in the United States
Swedish migration to North America
Pietism
Radical Pietism